The Crows Nest Fire Station, at  99 Shirley Road, Crows Nest, New South Wales is a registered building on the former Register of the National Estate.

It was designed by government architect W.L. Vernon.

References

Fire stations in Sydney
Crows Nest, New South Wales
New South Wales places listed on the defunct Register of the National Estate